The 1901 European Figure Skating Championships were held on January 13 in Vienna, Austria. Elite figure skaters competed for the title of European Champion in the category of men's singles. The competitors performed only compulsory figures.

The following two years the Europeans were planned to be held in Amsterdam, Netherlands. Both these years there was no ice in Amsterdam. In 1902, the championships were cancelled. In 1903, the championship were moved to Stockholm, Sweden, but in Stockholm was on only one contestant. Therefore, also in 1903 the Europeans were cancelled. The Europeans were continued in 1904.

Results

Men

Judges:
 W. von Sresnewsky 
 H. Ehrentraut 
 Karl Kaiser 
 Tibor von Földváry 
 Ludwig Fänner

References

Sources
 Result List provided by the ISU

European Figure Skating Championships, 1901
European Figure Skating Championships
International figure skating competitions hosted by Austria
1901 in Austrian sport
Sports competitions in Vienna
January 1901 sports events
1900s in Vienna